Cost of Living is a 2016 play by playwright Martyna Majok. It premiered in Williamstown, Massachusetts at the Williamstown Theatre Festival on June 29, 2016, and had an Off-Broadway engagement in 2017. The play won the 2018 Pulitzer Prize for Drama as well as two Lucille Lortel Awards, including Outstanding Play.

Plot
The play examines two pairs of relationships between disabled and able persons: one between John, a graduate student with cerebral palsy and his female caregiver, Jess, and the other between Ani, who became a quadriplegic following a tragic accident and her ex-husband, Eddie, an unemployed truck driver.

Cast
Gregg Mozgala and Katy Sullivan, the actors who originated the disabled characters, have those disabilities in real life.

The following tables show the casts of the principal original productions:

Production history
Cost of Living was expanded from the 2015 two-character one-act Majok play John, Who's Here From Cambridge by adding a second couple. John, Who's Here From Cambridge ran Off-Broadway from May 28 – June 20, 2015. Cost of Living made its world premiere during a June 29 – July 10, 2016 run at the Williamstown Theatre Festival. It then moved to New York City Center for a production by Manhattan Theatre Club that had previews beginning on May 16, 2017, and officially opened on June 7, 2017. Williamstown Theatre Festival co-produced the Off-Broadway debut with the Manhattan Theatre Club. In 2018, Williamstown Theatre Festival announced that they had commissioned a musical adaptation from Michael John LaChiusa. The play made its Broadway debut in the fall of 2022 at Manhattan Theatre Club's Samuel J. Friedman Theatre.

Awards and nominations
Cost of Living earned three Lucille Lortel Awards nominations on April 4, 2018. It eventually won in two of the three categories, tying with School Girls; Or, the African Mean Girls Play for Outstanding Play and earning Outstanding Featured Actor in a Play for Gregg Mozgala. On April 16, the play earned Majok, a University of Chicago and Yale School of Drama graduate, the Pulitzer Prize for Drama for her work that explores "diverse perceptions of privilege and human connection through two pairs of mismatched individuals". The play received 4 Outer Critics Circle Awards nominations. It also received both a Drama Desk Award and a Drama League Award nomination. Although, Cost of Living received no Off Broadway Alliance Awards in 2018, Director Jo Bonney earned one of the Legend of Off Broadway Awards from the organization in 2018.

Notes

External links

Plays and musicals about disability
Pulitzer Prize for Drama-winning works
2016 plays